This is a list of notable events in country music that took place in the year 1975.

Events
March 13 — The rocky marriage of George Jones and Tammy Wynette ends in divorce.
July 17 — A Russian-language version of Conway Twitty's 1970 hit, "Hello Darlin'" is played and broadcast to a worldwide audience as part of the Apollo-Soyuz Test Project. The song, which in Russian was called "Privet Radost," is a "gesture of goodwill" from the Apollo crew to the Soviet Union's Soyuz crew. Twitty worked with a language professor from the University of Oklahoma to record the phonetic Russian version of the song.
August 8 — While mountain climbing at Ajax Mountain, Montana, Hank Williams, Jr. is involved in a catastrophic accident. He tumbles nearly 500 feet and is critically injured, suffering numerous facial and head injuries. His recovery takes nearly two years, during which time he undergoes a major cosmetic — and musical — overhaul.
October — The defining moment in the recent debate over what defines country music – and each side's vision of the genre – comes at the Country Music Association awards. Charlie Rich, the 1974 CMA Entertainer of the Year, was selected to name the new Entertainer of the Year. When he opened the envelope, he took out his cigarette lighter, lighted the piece of paper with the winner's name on fire, and disgustedly announced the winner: "My good friend John Denver!" Denver, who was not present, was humbled at his award (but didn't know until later about Rich's actions).

No dates
 The deaths of three country music legends — Bob Wills, George Morgan and Lefty Frizzell — leave a huge void among fans.
 During a CBS documentary recorded and realised this year, Doolittle Lynn, husband of Loretta Lynn tells the world he “wants his wife to come home.”
 Six songs that reach No. 1 on the Billboard Hot Country Singles chart also reach the top of the Hot 100 chart: "(Hey Won't You Play) Another Somebody Done Somebody Wrong Song" by B. J. Thomas; "Before the Next Teardrop Falls" by Freddy Fender; "Thank God I'm a Country Boy" and "I'm Sorry," both by John Denver; "Rhinestone Cowboy" by Glen Campbell; and "Convoy" by C. W. McCall.
 In addition, several other songs that reach the top on one of the charts does very well on the other, including "Have You Never Been Mellow" and "Please Mr. Please" by Olivia Newton-John; "I'm Not Lisa" by Jessi Colter; Fender's "Wasted Days and Wasted Nights"; and "When Will I Be Loved" by Linda Ronstadt.

Top hits of the year

Number-one hits

United States
(as certified by Billboard)

Notes
1^ No. 1 song of the year, as determined by Billboard.
2^ Song dropped from No. 1 and later returned to top spot.
A^ First Billboard No. 1 hit for that artist.
B^ Last Billboard No. 1 hit for that artist.
C^ Only Billboard No. 1 hit for that artist to date.

Canada
(as certified by RPM)

Notes
1^ No. 1 song of the year, as determined by RPM.
A^ First RPM No. 1 hit for that artist.
B^ Last RPM No. 1 hit for that artist.
C^ Only RPM No. 1 hit for that artist.

Other major hits

Singles released by American artists

Singles released by Canadian artists

Top new album releases

Other new album releases

Births
 June 15 — Rachel Proctor, singer-songwriter best known for her 2004 hit "Me and Emily"
 August 11 — Chris Cummings, Canadian country singer of 1990s and 2000s
 September 13 — Joe Don Rooney, member of Rascal Flatts
 November 20 — Dierks Bentley, new traditionalist-styled singer of the 2000s
 November 30 — Mindy McCready, popular country singer from the late 1990s (died 2013)
 December 18 — Randy Houser, late-2000s singer

Deaths
February 4 — Louis Jordan, 66, jazz and rhythm & blues pioneer who became the first African-American performer to have a No. 1 hit on the Billboard country charts (1944's "Ration Blues") (heart attack).
February 17 — A.C. "Eck" Robertson, 88, pioneering American fiddle player, widely considered the first fiddler and country musician to record commercially.
May 13 — Bob Wills, 70, leader of the Texas Playboys (complications from a stroke).
July 7 — George Morgan, 51, country crooner of the late 1940s and early 1950s, Grand Ole Opry favorite and father of Lorrie Morgan (heart attack).
July 19 — Lefty Frizzell, 47, honky-tonk pioneer of the 1950s (stroke).
November 3 — Audrey Williams, 52, mother of Hank Williams Jr. (and ex-wife of Hank Williams Sr.)

Country Music Hall of Fame Inductees
Minnie Pearl (1912–1996)

Major awards

Grammy Awards
Best Female Country Vocal Performance — "I Can't Help It (If I'm Still in Love with You)", Linda Ronstadt
Best Male Country Vocal Performance — "Blue Eyes Crying in the Rain", Willie Nelson
Best Country Performance by a Duo or Group with Vocal — "Lover Please", Kris Kristofferson and Rita Coolidge
Best Country Instrumental Performance — "The Entertainer", Chet Atkins
Best Country Song — "(Hey Won't You Play) Another Somebody Done Somebody Wrong Song", Chips Moman and Larry Butler (Performer: B. J. Thomas)

Juno Awards
Country Male Vocalist of the Year — Stompin' Tom Connors
Country Female Vocalist of the Year — Anne Murray
Country Group or Duo of the Year — Carlton Showband

Academy of Country Music
Entertainer of the Year — Loretta Lynn
Song of the Year — "Rhinestone Cowboy," Larry Weiss (Performer: Glen Campbell)
Single of the Year — "Rhinestone Cowboy," Glen Campbell
Album of the Year — Feelins', Loretta Lynn and Conway Twitty
Top Male Vocalist — Conway Twitty
Top Female Vocalist — Loretta Lynn
Top Vocal Duo — Conway Twitty and Loretta Lynn
Top New Male Vocalist — Freddy Fender
Top New Female Vocalist — Crystal Gayle

Country Music Association
Entertainer of the Year — John Denver
Song of the Year — "Back Home Again", John Denver (Performer: John Denver)
Single of the Year — "Before the Next Teardrop Falls", Freddy Fender
Album of the Year — A Legend in My Time, Ronnie Milsap
Male Vocalist of the Year — Waylon Jennings
Female Vocalist of the Year — Dolly Parton
Vocal Duo of the Year — Conway Twitty and Loretta Lynn
Vocal Group of the Year — The Statler Brothers
Instrumentalist of the Year — Johnny Gimble
Instrumental Group of the Year — Roy Clark and Buck Trent

Further reading
Kingsbury, Paul, "The Grand Ole Opry: History of Country Music. 70 Years of the Songs, the Stars and the Stories," Villard Books, Random House; Opryland USA, 1995
Kingsbury, Paul, "Vinyl Hayride: Country Music Album Covers 1947–1989," Country Music Foundation, 2003
Millard, Bob, "Country Music: 70 Years of America's Favorite Music," HarperCollins, New York, 1993
Whitburn, Joel, "Top Country Songs 1944–2005 – 6th Edition." 2005.

References

Other links
Country Music Association
Inductees of the Country Music Hall of Fame

External links
Country Music Hall of Fame

Country
Country music by year